Reckange is a small town in the commune of Mersch, in central Luxembourg.  , the town has a population of 587.

The nearby Menhir of Beisenerbierg is a Neolithic age standing-stone.

References

Mersch
Towns in Luxembourg